The 933rd "Nahal" Brigade is one of the Israel Defense Forces main infantry brigades. On June 28,  was appointed as the new commander. However, three days later, on July 1, Asman suddenly died during morning training. As a result, Shomer was issued command again until a permanent replacement could be found.

History
It was established as a separate brigade in 1982, in response to the growing need for infantry manpower, before the 1982 Lebanon War. Its 50th battalion was originally part of the Paratrooper Brigade in the 1950s. It is formed mainly from regular draftees, as well as from a core of soldiers from the Nahal group, part of the Nahal movement, which combines social volunteerism, agriculture (historically the establishment of kibbutz farming communities) and military service. Many Mahal foreign volunteers are also known to serve in the Nahal Brigade, providing a highly motivated and disciplined core of soldiers for the brigade.

Nahal Brigade soldiers are distinguished by their light green berets, which earned them the nickname "sticklights" (Hebrew for glowsticks). The brigade is composed of 4 active-duty battalions – 50, 931, 932, and 934 (the Gadsar, Hebrew for reconnaissance battalion) – and the various companies on its training base, which together comprise Battalion 933.

It operates on a rotational basis on the most volatile Israeli borders (Lebanon, Syria and Gaza) as well as in the West Bank territories. It is tasked with regular patrol and observation operations on the borders, counter-terrorist operations and riot control in the West Bank as well as tactical assault support to police operations in the territories.

It has operated in all major wars and large-scale operations since its inception, playing key roles during the First and Second Lebanon War and the First and Second Intifada.

On 10 June 1982, the Israeli air force mistook a column of IDF Nahal forces for a Syrian commando unit. An IAF F-4 Phantom attacked the Battalion 931, advancing in open APCs in south-eastern Lebanon with cluster ammunition. The unit suffered 24 soldiers killed and 108 wounded, with a further 30 soldiers shell shocked.

 It was the worst friendly-fire incident in the history of the IDF.

On 4 September 1982 a four-member Palestinian squad attacked an observation post manned by eight soldiers from the Nahal brigade. All the Israeli soldiers surrendered without firing a single bullet. Israel was then forced, in two separate exchange deals, to release almost 6,000 Palestinian prisoners in exchange for the captured Nahal soldiers. The deals were severely criticized in Israel, for being extremely "lopsided". The less than heroic behaviour of the Nahal brigade soldiers was also pointed out. The Nahal Brigade Commander Gilboa went as far as branding the soldiers of his own brigade as "eight cowards".

In November 1987, two PFLP-GC fighters managed to slip through the Lebanese-Israeli border on hang gliders. One of them was cornered and killed by IDF. The second fighter, Miloud Najah from Tunisia, avoided capture and attacked an IDF base outside Kiryat Shemona in northern Israel, manned by Nahal brigade soldiers. In a two minutes exchange of fire Najah succeeded in killing six Nahal soldiers and wounding another ten, before being killed himself. The Palestinian victory was widely celebrated in the Palestinian Occupied Territories and contributed to the outbreak of the First Intifada.

In November 2002 three Nahal soldiers were killed in an ambush in the Palestinian city of Hebron. Another nine IDF soldiers and security personnel were killed in the incident, including Col. Weinberg, the commander of the Hebron brigade, were killed in the clash. The battle was widely seen as a victory for the Palestinian Islamic Jihad, who lost three fighters in the incident.

Training 

Nahal Infantry Brigade soldiers undertake around four months of basic training and around four months of advanced training in the Israeli desert.

Basic training: consists primarily of physical conditioning, Krav Maga, rifle training and the qualifying obstacle course. Recruits begin their desert marches at this point in order to prepare them for their beret march at the end of advanced training (70+ kilometers, depending on company). These marches are performed fully kitted in order to prepare them for battlefield marching. Rifle training aims to perfect recruits' day and night shooting skills prior to advanced training. Recruits will also undergo two-man team live firing exercises in the field. Weapon understanding and maintenance is also an important element of basic rifle training. Recruits are taught army values and weapon safety and responsibility. Recruits are also introduced to long field exercises in the desert. There they will learn to survive for the first time on combat rations, limited water, extreme desert heat, sleep deprivation, and field injuries all while being subjected to intense physical activity. Camouflage, fortification construction, combat first aid, and stealth maneuvering will also be taught at this stage.

Advanced training: recruits undergo specialist combat training. This part of the training will primarily take part out in the field. By this stage recruits are expected to comfortably cope with speed-marching in full kit, distances ranging from 15 to 30 kilometers during field exercises. By the end of their training recruits will have been required to march over 400 kilometers through desert and mountainous terrain. Recruits will also be expected to be fully proficient with their rifles, both maintenance and shooting. Recruits displaying certain aptitudes will be sent on various specialist courses: sharpshooter training, squad automatic gunner training, tactical MATADOR-missile training, radio operator’s course, advanced camouflage and fortifications course, combat paramedic course, APC driver’s course, and tunnel and close-quarter training course. Training with helicopters will also be introduced at this stage, although this can vary from draft to draft. All recruits will learn how to conduct live-fire drills at a squad, platoon, and company level. Recruits will learn how to operate both on open field battlefields (desert and mountain) as well as in urban terrain. Room and building clearing training will take place during this stage of training. Recruits will also take part in more advanced Krav Maga training and introduced to crowd-control methods (tear gas, non-lethal ammunition, physical restraint techniques).

At the end of advanced training recruits will qualify as IDF "lochamim" ("warriors") after they complete:

1. War Week: An intense one-week-long war simulation in the field. Recruits will be on combat alert during the whole exercise requiring them to be in full kit, at all times, throughout the week. They will be purposely subjected to extreme sleep deprivation, very limited food rations, and physical exhaustion in order to prepare them for the extreme conditions of war. Recruits will also be required to put into practice their training against heat strokes and hypothermia. Desert temperatures will fluctuate dramatically from day to night. During this time recruits will be expected to cope with intense marches carrying regular kit and support weaponry. Recruits will carry out numerous intense live-firing exercises at a company level, including fire support from the tank and artillery divisions where available. After War Week recruits will earn the Nahal warrior ("lochem") insignia, qualifying them as IDF combat-ready soldiers.

1. Beret March: A 70+ kilometer (depending on company) night march through the desert’s mountains. This is performed fully kitted and at full tactical march speed, usually ending at Masada. After this recruits earn their green beret at a ceremony at the Nahal Memorial.

As of 2013 Nahal pioneered a new form of very advanced training aimed at their qualified combat personnel. After advanced training soldiers undergo a further stage of specialist training, combined with border guarding. During this time soldiers will undergo advanced urban warfare training, advanced navigation training, open field and mountain fighting training, Krav Maga, and brigade-wide live fire exercises with support from the artillery, tank, special forces, and air force brigades.

Specific soldiers will be sent on specialist courses including: driver’s course, riot dispersal and non-lethal ammunition training, tactical shooting course, and sniper school.

Battalions 

 50th "Bazelet"/"Basalt" Infantry Battalion
 931st "Shaham"/"Onyx" Infantry Battalion
 932nd "Granit"/"Granite" Infantry Battalion
 934th "Topaz"/"Topaz" Reconnaissance Battalion
 "Palsar"/"Flint" Reconnaissance Company
 "Palnat"/"Gazit" Anti-Tank Company
 "Palhan"/"Sapphire" Engineer Company
 "Palhik"/"Agate" Signal Company

Battalions 931 and 932 are composed entirely of soldiers who draft through the Bakum.

The 50th Battalion has a unique makeup. Two-thirds of its companies are made up of bnei gar'inim, groups that spend a year running programs in lower socio-economic communities before being drafted to the army. Following that year, they go through infantry training, taking around 8 months, and then serve in the same manner as other infantry units for about a year. This period is followed by around half a year of community service, at the end of which their term of service closes with another 4–6 months as infantrymen. The other third of the 50th battalion is composed of bakumistim, or soldiers who draft regularly to the unit through the Bakum.

Prior to 2006, it was the case both groups of prospective 50th battalion soldiers were required to pass a two-day gibbush (selection phase) before being drafted in order to get into the 50th Battalion and also that part of the battalion's training comprised a paratrooper course after advanced infantry training (hence Nahal Mutznaḥ, or Airborne Nahal, the name of the battalion before being transferred to the Nahal brigade). Since 2006, however, both the gibbush and the paratrooper course were dropped and the 50th became a regular infantry battalion. In 2010 Nahal soldiers from the 50th Battalion produced IDF Tick Tock, a viral video of themselves dancing as a flash mob in the streets of Hebron.

The fourth active-duty Nahal battalion, the Gadsar (Reconnaissance battalion), was created in the early 1990s to serve as a special reconnaissance detachment for the brigade. Soldiers wishing to serve in this elite battalion must pass a five-day gibbush, a physically and mentally grueling test similar to "hell week" (approximately 1 in 4 finish the week and 1 in 8 are accepted to the training program), after which they are dispersed into specialized training programs for each of the three companies that make up the battalion: the Palsar (Reconnaissance Company), the Palnat (Anti-Tank Company, commonly known as the Orev company), and the Palhan (Engineering and Explosives Company). Soldiers in this battalion undergo an additional 8 months of training in krav maga, urban combat, navigation, camouflage, parachuting and other specialized courses. During periods of low intensity conflict, the companies are tasked with capturing enemies of the state and serve as counter-terrorism forces, raiding terrorist homes and hideouts. Gadsar Nahal won the IDF Chief of Staff prize in 2010 for best land combat unit.

Image gallery

See also
 The Bhamdoun abduction operation (1982)
 Night of the Gliders

References

External links

 IDF website section on Nahal Brigade
 Official Nahal Website (Hebrew)

Brigades of Israel
Infantry of Israel
Military units and formations established in 1982